Oidium tingitaninum is a plant pathogen affecting citrus.

See also
 List of citrus diseases

References

External links

Fungal citrus diseases
tingitaninum
Fungi described in 1915